Otto Tief ( – 5 March 1976) was an Estonian politician, military commander (during the Estonian War of Independence), and a lawyer.

Tief was the acting prime minister of the last government of Estonia before Soviet troops occupied Estonia in the Second World War in September 1944. Due to his commitment to his country, Tief is regarded by many of his fellow countrymen as a symbol of national resistance.

Education and career

Tief studied law in St Petersburg between 1910 and 1916. During the Estonian War of Independence, Tief was a commander in the Kalevlaste Maleva battalion formed in 1918 by members of the Kalev sports society. Following the war, he graduated in law from the University of Tartu in 1921. He served as legal counsel to the Estonian Land Bank and also worked in private practice as a lawyer. Tief was elected to the third Riigikogu in 1926 and served as the Minister of Social Affairs from 1926 to 1927. In 1928 he was the Minister of Justice. In 1932 he was elected to the fifth Riigikogu.

Tief government of 1944

During the turbulent days in September 1944, between the retreat of the German occupation forces in Estonia and the onslaught of the Red Army, the acting President of the Republic of Estonia Jüri Uluots appointed Tief as a Prime Minister and asked him to form a government on 18 September 1944. Tief then published a proclamation, re-establishing the independence of the Republic of Estonia on the basis of legal continuity, and attempted to organise the defence of Tallinn against the invading Red Army, which pushed into the capital on 22 September 1944.

Members of the Tief's government:
 Otto Tief – Acting Prime Minister and Minister of Interior
 Arnold Susi – Minister of Public Education
 Johannes Klesment (escaped to Sweden, assumed office 13 January 1945) – Minister of Justice
 Kaarel Liidak (died 16 January 1945) – Minister of Agriculture
 Hugo Pärtelpoeg (died 29 April 1951) – Minister of Finance
 Voldemar Sumberg – Minister of Social Affairs
 Juhan Pikkov (died 3 September 1947) – Minister of Communications
 August Rei (in Sweden, assumed office 31 December 1944, until 9 January 1945) – Minister of Foreign Affairs
 Juhan Kaarlimäe – Minister
 Johannes Sikkar (in Sweden, from 20 April 1952) – Minister
 Artur Terras (in Sweden, from 20 April 1952) – Minister

Aftermath
Otto Tief was arrested by the Soviet authorities on 10 October 1944. In 1945 he was sentenced to ten years of imprisonment in the Siberian Gulag. Returning to Estonia in 1956, he was forced to leave for Ukraine until 1965, when he was permitted to return to the Baltic region to live just beyond the Estonian border in Latvia. When Tief died on 5 March 1976, the Soviet security services would not allow his burial in the national cemetery in Tallinn. When Estonia regained independence in 1991, he was reinterred there in 1993, in the presence of a large number of people who came to honour him.

Tief's symbolic significance
Tief held power for only a brief period of time (18-22 September 1944), and his efforts were rapidly undone by the invading Red Army. However, Tief's actions have immense symbolic and legal significance, as his proclaiming of the restoration of the Republic of Estonia, as well as the accompanying raising of the Estonian flag atop the tower of Pikk Hermann high above Tallinn at the seat of power in the Toompea quarter negates Soviet historiography's claims, according to which the invasion of Estonia by the Red Army in September 1944 constituted "the liberation of Estonia". Although the attempt to restore Estonian independence in September 1944 did not succeed, the Tief government proved to be an integral and indispensable part of the de jure continuity of the Republic of Estonia, upon which the current state rests.

Commemoration
In February 2007, the Riigikogu decided to commemorate the actions of Tief's government by proclaiming 22 September to be the annual "Day of Resistance". 22 September 1944 was the day, several days after the departure of Nazi Germany's occupying forces, that the invading Red Army took over the administrative centre of Tallinn, tore down the Estonian national flag, and replaced it with the Red Banner, the symbol of Soviet occupation.

References

Citations

Bibliography

 
 Otto Tief, "Mälestusi aastaist 1944–1954" – Akadeemia 1990, nr. 2, lk. 231–250 

1889 births
1976 deaths
People from Rapla Parish
People from the Governorate of Estonia
Settlers' Party politicians
Prime Ministers of Estonia
Government ministers of Estonia
Members of the Riigikogu, 1926–1929
Members of the Riigikogu, 1932–1934
Estonian anti-communists
Estonian independence activists
Russian military personnel of World War I
Estonian military personnel of the Estonian War of Independence
Estonian people of World War II
Estonian prisoners and detainees
Prisoners and detainees of the Soviet Union
Burials at Metsakalmistu